Juan Aguilera may refer to:
Juan Aguilera (Chilean footballer) (1903–?), Chilean footballer
Juan Miguel Aguilera (born 1960), Spanish writer
Juan Aguilera (tennis) (born 1962), Spanish tennis player
Juan Aguilera (Spanish footballer) (born 1985), Spanish footballer